Zsolt Merczel (born 7 March 1990 in Budapest) is a professional Hungarian footballer currently plays for Vasas SC.

External links
 HLSZ 
 MLSZ 

1990 births
Living people
Footballers from Budapest
Hungarian footballers
Association football defenders
Vasas SC players
Rákospalotai EAC footballers
BKV Előre SC footballers